Princess Yachts Limited is a British motor yacht manufacturer based in Plymouth, Devon, England.

Profile
Established in Plymouth in 1965 as Marine Projects (Plymouth) Ltd, Princess Yachts was bought in 1981 by South African businessman Graham J. Beck. Marine Projects became Princess Yachts International PLC in 2001. In June 2008, Beck sold a 75% stake in the business to French businessman Bernard Arnault's investment group, L Capital 2 FCPR, an investment group co-sponsored by LVMH (Moët Hennessy Louis Vuitton) and Groupe Arnault. In January 2016, L Capital merged with Catterton to become L Catterton. 

Princess Yachts operates in 119 countries and employs over 3,200 people worldwide, whilst their shipyards cover a combined area of over 1.1 million square feet.

Range of yachts 
The range is sub-divided into the following class types: X Class, Y Class, F Class, V Class, S Class and R Class.
 X Class: super flybridge yachts ranging from 80 to  95 feet.
 Y Class: Motor yachts ranging from 72 to 95 feet.
 F Class: Flybridge yachts ranging from 45 to 62 feet.
 V Class: sports yachts ranging from 40 to 78 feet.
 S Class: sportbridge yachts ranging from 62 to 78 feet.
 R Class: fully carbon fibre performance sports yacht at 35 feet

Partnership with BAR Technologies and Pininfarina 
In January 2018, Princess Yachts announced they were partnering with BAR Technologies to create a new yacht, the Princess R Class, to be launched later in 2018(3). BAR Technologies, founded by Ben Ainslie, is a team of naval architects and engineers formed to use the skills and experience built up by the British yacht racing team, Land Rover BAR.

The new yacht is fully carbon fibre and features Princess’ Active Foil System, resulting in Princess’ fastest yacht to date. Princess also collaborated with Italian design house, Pininfarina to create the R Class' carbon-fibre monocoque hull, enhancing the boat's aerodynamics.

During its development stage, the R Class has been covered in dazzle camouflage to confuse the eye and help conceal its design from competitors. The camouflage was created by Katie Sheppard, a student at the Plymouth College of Art, who won a competition to design the pattern.

See also
Sunseeker International
Fairline Yachts

References

External links

British companies established in 1965
Companies based in Plymouth, Devon
British boat builders
Yacht building companies
LVMH brands